Kateřina Böhmová (born 18 November 1986) is a retired Czech professional tennis player. She is the daughter of Kateřina Böhmová-Skronská, Czechoslovak tennis player active in the 1980s. Through marriage she is also known as Kateřina Klapková.

Her career high singles ranking is World No 107, which she achieved on 12 June 2006. Her biggest career highlight is winning the Girls' Doubles title at the 2004 French Open, partnering Michaëlla Krajicek.

Biography
Böhmová has won three ITF Women's Circuit titles in her career, including the Barcelona Challenger in 2005; and has played on many WTA Tour events. She has made one Grand Slam main draw- at the 2005 Wimbledon Championships where she lost in a tight three-setter to No.9 seed Anastasia Myskina, 5–7, 7–6(7–5), 6–4. In 2004, Kateřina, alongside Michaëlla Krajicek, won the Girls' Doubles title at the 2004 French Open. She was also the runner-up at the 2003 French Open and the 2003 Wimbledon Championships Girls' Doubles events, both with Krajicek.

Career statistics

Singles Finals: 7 (3–4)

Doubles Finals: 1 (0–1)

External links
 
  

Living people
1986 births
Sportspeople from Ostrava
Czech female tennis players
French Open junior champions
Grand Slam (tennis) champions in girls' doubles